The Leaffony River is a small river that runs through County Sligo in Ireland.  It is sometimes known as the Cullens River.

There are claims that the river may previously have been known as the Geloir, meaning clear and mentioned several times in old records of Sligo.

References 

Rivers of County Sligo